The 1935–36 Sussex County Football League season was the 16th in the history of the competition.

League table
The league featured 14 clubs, 13 which competed in the last season, along with one new club:
 Eastbourne Comrades

League table

References

1935-36
9